Michał Derus (born 21 September 1990) is a Polish track and field athlete, competing in the T47 disability classification for athletes with an impairment to a lower arm.

Personal history
Derus was born in Tarnów, Poland in 1990. Derus was born with dysmelia in his left hand which left it underdeveloped.

Sporting history
Derus took up sport whilst in secondary school. He initially chose swimming but switched to athletics stating that he enjoyed the adrenaline rush in the build up to a race. He wanted to compete in Parasport events, but a ruling disqualified him from being classified. In 2008 he was on the verge of quitting athletics but was persuaded to remain by his coach who believed the ruling would be overturned in the future.

In 2013 Derus was finally able to compete in para athletics and was classified as a T47 sprinter. He entered his first major international competition that year, representing Poland at the 2013 IPC Athletics World Championships in Lyon. There he won a gold in the 100 metre sprint and a silver in the 200 metre. He followed this with double gold in both events at the 2014 IPC Athletics European Championships in Swansea. In 2015 he successfully defended his World 100 metre title in Doha, and again won silver in the 200 metres. The 2015 World Championships also saw Derus compete in the long jump, finishing ninth with a distance of 6.24m.

In 2016 he travelled to Rio to compete in the 2016 Summer Paralympics. He competed in the 100 metre sprint and the long jump. Although failing to qualify through the heats of the long jump, finishing 11th overall, he finished second in the heats of the 100m to take him through to the finals. In the finals, he posted a time of 10.79 seconds in a photo finish for the silver medal behind Brazil's Petrúcio Ferreira. 2016 also saw Derus claim a second European medal with victory in the 100 metres in Grosseto.

References

1990 births
Living people
Polish male sprinters
Polish male long jumpers
Sportspeople from Tarnów
Paralympic athletes of Poland
Athletes (track and field) at the 2016 Summer Paralympics
Paralympic silver medalists for Poland
Medalists at the 2016 Summer Paralympics
Paralympic medalists in athletics (track and field)
Medalists at the World Para Athletics European Championships
Athletes (track and field) at the 2020 Summer Paralympics
21st-century Polish people
20th-century Polish people